This is a list of equestrian statues in France. In each region, statues are ranked by chronological order of first erection in the listed location.

Paris and Ile-de-France

Paris
 Henri IV on the Pont Neuf, by François-Frédéric Lemot (1818) replacing destroyed predecessor of 1614
 Louis XIII on Place des Vosges, by Charles Dupaty and Jean-Pierre Cortot (1825), marble replacing destroyed bronze predecessor of 1639
 Louis XIV on Place des Victoires, by François Joseph Bosio (1828)
 Joan of Arc on Rue de Rivoli, by Emmanuel Frémiet (1874, reworked in 1899)
 Genius of Arts on the Louvre Palace façade facing the Seine, by Antonin Mercié (1877) replacing a bas-relief of Napoleon III by Antoine-Louis Barye (1869) deposed on 6 September 1870 and now at the Château de Compiègne
 Charlemagne et ses Leudes in front of Notre-Dame de Paris, by the brothers Louis and Charles Rochet (1878), erected in 1882
 Etienne Marcel besides the Hôtel de Ville, by Antonin Idrac and Laurent Marqueste (1888)
 The Poet astride Pegasus near , by Alexandre Falguière (1897)
 Joan of Arc in front of Saint-Augustin, by Paul Dubois (1895), erected in 1900
 George Washington on Place d'Iéna, by Daniel Chester French and Edward Clark Potter (1900)
 Gladiator by Isidore Bonheur (1902), erected in Sainte-Anne Hospital Center in 1942
 Saint Louis  and Joan of Arc in front of the Basilique du Sacré-Cœur, by Hippolyte Lefèbvre (1927)
 Simón Bolívar on the Cours-la-Reine, by Emmanuel Frémiet (1930), new cast of 1910 original in Bogotá, relocated to current site in 1980
 Alexander I of Yugoslavia at La Muette, by Maxime Real del Sarte (1936)
 Joseph Joffre in front of École Militaire, by Maxime Real del Sarte (1939)
 José de San Martín in the Parc Montsouris, by Louis-Joseph Daumas (1960), new cast of 1862 original in Buenos Aires
 Louis XIV in front of Louvre Pyramid, by Gian Lorenzo Bernini (1988), cast in lead of the 1670s marble original kept at Versailles

Ile-de-France
 Marble statue of Louis XIV at the Palace of Versailles, by Gian Lorenzo Bernini (1670s); now replaced by a copy at the end of the 
 Ferdinand Philippe, Duke of Orléans in Neuilly-sur-Seine, by Carlo Marochetti (1845), initially erected near Djamaa el Djedid in Algiers and relocated in 1981
 Louis XIV in front of the Palace of Versailles, by Pierre Cartellier and Louis Petitot (1837), originally intended for the Place de la Concorde; repositioned in 2009
 Anne de Montmorency at the Château de Chantilly, by Paul Dubois (1886)
 Henri d'Orléans, Duke of Aumale in front of the Château de Chantilly, by Jean-Léon Gérôme (1899)

Auvergne-Rhône-Alpes
 Louis XIV on Place Bellecour in Lyon, by François-Frédéric Lemot (1826), replacing destroyed predecessor of 1713
 Napoleon on the Prairie de la Rencontre in Laffrey, by Emmanuel Frémiet (1868), originally erected in Grenoble, warehoused in 1870 and re-erected at present site in 1929
 Vercingetorix on Place de Jaude in Clermont-Ferrand, by Frédéric Auguste Bartholdi (1903)
 Joan of Arc in Saint-Étienne, by Emmanuel Frémiet (1916), new cast of the Paris version
 Sur les Talons in Briançon, by Gari (2016)

Bourgogne-Franche-Comté
 Joan of Arc in Alise-Sainte-Reine, by Mathurin Moreau and Pierre Le Nordez (1901), new cast of the Montebourg version
 The Defense in Chalon-sur-Saône, by Paul Moreau-Vauthier (1907)

Bretagne
 General Lariboisiere in Fougères, by Georges Récipon (1893)
 Bertrand du Guesclin in Dinan, by Emmanuel Frémiet (1902)

Centre-Val-de-Loire
 Joan of Arc on place du Martroi in Orléans, by Denis Foyatier (1855)
 Louis XII above the portal of the Château de Blois, by Charles Émile Seurre (1857), replacing destroyed predecessor of 1507 
 Joan of Arc in Chinon, by Jules Roulleau (1893)
 Joan of Arc in Blois, by Anna Hyatt Huntington (1921)

Corse
 Napoleon and his brothers in Ajaccio, by Antoine-Louis Barye (1865), relocated to nearby site in 1969
  in Biguglia, by Cesare Rabiti (2009)

Grand Est
 Joan of Arc at Place Jeanne D'Arc, Nancy, by Emmanuel Frémiet (1889), reworked from the earlier Paris version
 Joan of Arc at Place du Parvis, Reims, by Paul Dubois (1896), new cast of the Paris version, erected in 1900
 Joan of Arc in Mirecourt, by Emmanuel Frémiet (1903), new cast of the Paris version
 Joan of Arc at the Ballon d'Alsace, by Mathurin Moreau and Pierre Le Nordez (1906), new cast of the Montebourg version
 Joan of Arc in Strasbourg, by Paul Dubois (1897), new cast of the Paris version first erected in front of the Palais du Rhin in 1920, relocated to present site in 1965
 Joan of Arc in Gandrange, by Mathurin Moreau and Pierre Le Nordez (1921), new cast of the Montebourg version
 Joan of Arc in the military cemetery of Plaine, by Xavier Obert (1924)
 Joan of Arc in Bischoffsheim, by Paul Brutschi (1924)
 Joan of Arc in Marlenheim, by Alois Ruscher (1948)
 Joan of Arc in Vaucouleurs, by Georges Halbout (1951), initially erected near the Grande Poste in Algiers and relocated in 1966

Hauts-de-France
 Louis I, Duke of Orléans in the Château de Pierrefonds, by Emmanuel Frémiet (1869)
 Louis Faidherbe in Lille, by Antonin Mercié (1896)
 Joan of Arc in Lille, by Emmanuel Frémiet (1912), new cast of the Paris version, stolen in 1918 and replaced in 1925
 Joan of Arc in Compiègne, by Emmanuel Frémiet (1930), new cast of the Paris version
 Ferdinand Foch in Cassel, by Georges Malissard (1928)
 Douglas Haig in Montreuil-sur-Mer, by Paul Landowski (1931), melted by German occupation forces in 1940 and recast in 1950
 Ferdinand Foch in Lille, by Edgar-Henri Boutry (1936)

Normandie
 William the Conqueror in Falaise, by the brothers Louis and Charles Rochet (1851)
 Napoleon in Cherbourg-Octeville, by Armand Le Véel (1858)
 Joan of Arc in Montebourg, by Mathurin Moreau and Pierre Le Nordez (1899)
 Ferdinand Philippe, Duke of Orléans at the Château d'Eu, by Carlo Marochetti (1845), second cast of the version now in Neuilly-sur-Seine, initially erected in the Cour Carrée of the Louvre in Paris, relocated to Versailles in 1848 and to the present location in 1971

Nouvelle-Aquitaine
 King Francis I in Cognac, by Antoine Étex (1864)
 Monument to the fallen in the Franco-Prussian War in Bordeaux, by Jean Georges Pierre Achard (1913)
 Joan of Arc in La Chapelle-Saint-Laurent, by Mathurin Moreau and Pierre Le Nordez (1936), new cast of the Montebourg version
  in Lusignan, by Jane Conil (2007)

Occitanie
 Joan of Arc in Castres, by Emmanuel Frémiet (1914), new cast of the Paris version
 Joan of Arc in Toulouse, by Antonin Mercié (1922)

Pays de la Loire
 Napoleon in La Roche-sur-Yon, by Émilien de Nieuwerkerke (1854), new cast of the 1852 version then in Lyon 
 Joan of Arc in Nantes, by Charles-Auguste Lebourg (1904)
 Joan of Arc in Saint-Germain-sur-Moine, by Mathurin Moreau and Pierre Le Nordez (1914), new cast of the Montebourg version

Provence-Alpes-Côte-d'Azur
 Joan of Arc in Rognonas, by Mathurin Moreau and Pierre Le Nordez (1924), new cast of the Montebourg version

Disappeared statues
 Clovis, Dagobert, and Rudolf of Habsburg on the façade of Strasbourg Cathedral, late 13th or early 14th century, destroyed in December 1793
 Philip IV the Fair inside Notre-Dame de Paris, wood (14th century), destroyed in the early 1790s
 Charles VII above the entrance of the Palais Jacques Coeur in Bourges (c.1450), destroyed in 1792
 Louis XII above the entrance of the Château de Blois, by Guido Mazzoni (1507), destroyed in 1792
 Henry IV on the Pont Neuf in Paris, by Giambologna and Pietro Tacca (1611), erected in 1614 and destroyed in 1792
 Louis XIII on the façade of the Hôtel de Ville in Reims, by Nicolas Jacques (1624), destroyed in 1792
 Louis XIV on Place Royale, now  in Dijon, by Étienne Le Hongre (1690), erected in 1750 and destroyed in 1792
 Louis XIV on Place Louis-le-Grand, now Place Vendôme in Paris, by François Girardon (1699), destroyed in 1792
 Louis XIV on Place Bellecour in Lyon, by Martin Desjardins (late 17th century), erected in 1713 and destroyed in 1793
 Louis XIV on Place Royale, now  in Rennes, by Antoine Coysevox (1693), initially intended for Nantes, erected in 1726 and destroyed in 1793
 Louis XV on Place Royale, now Place de la Bourse in Bordeaux, by Jean-Baptiste Lemoyne, erected in 1743 and destroyed on 
 Louis XV on Place Louis XV, now Place de la Concorde in Paris, by Edmé Bouchardon and Jean-Baptiste Pigalle (1763), destroyed in 1792
 Napoleon I on Place Napoléon, now Place Carnot in Lyon, by Émilien de Nieuwerkerke (1852), destroyed in 1870-71
 Diego Velázquez on the Place du Louvre in Paris, by Emmanuel Frémiet (1892), relocated to the Casa de Velázquez in Madrid in the mid-1930s and destroyed during the Spanish Civil War
 Emperor Frederick III on Kaiserplatz, now  in Metz, by Franz Dorrenbach (1909), destroyed in 1918
 Emperor William I on Kaiserplatz, now Place de la République in Strasbourg (1911), destroyed in 1918

See also
 List of equestrian statues

Notes

France
Lists of buildings and structures in France